Aghunato is a sub division of the Zünheboto District of Nagaland, India. It has its own constituency in the state assembly and had 15659 registered voters in the 2013 elections. Aghunato is represented in the state Legislative Assembly by Pukhayi.   Its terrain is mountainous and dominated by evergreen forests.
Geographic coordinates:
92 longitude - latitude 28-24

See also

District Hq. 
 Zunheboto

Sub Division 
 Akuluto
 Satakha

District 
 Zunheboto District

References 

Cities and towns in Zünheboto district
Zünheboto district